Francis "Frank" Armstrong (3 October 1839 – 15 June 1899) was the fifth mayor of Salt Lake City, serving from 1886 to 1890.

Early life and career
Armstrong was born in Northumberland, England on 3 October 1839. His family migrated to Canada in 1851 in Hamilton, Ontario. Armstrong went to the Richmond, Missouri in 1858 where he worked in a saw mill. He became friends with David Whitmer, one of the Three Witnesses for the Book of Mormon. Armstrong moved to Utah in 1861. He married his first wife Isabella Siddoway on 10 December 1864, and they resided in Salt Lake City permanently. He also polygamously married Sarah Carruth in 1870  and Maren Jensen in 1887. Armstrong was elected as Mayor of Salt Lake City in 1886.

References

Mayors of Salt Lake City
Latter Day Saints from Utah
19th-century American politicians
People of Utah Territory
1839 births
1899 deaths
English emigrants to the United States